Synpalamides orestes is a moth of the family Castniidae. It was described by Francis Walker in 1854, and is known from Brazil.

References

Castniidae
Moths described in 1854